Lani Smith (1934 – 2015) was an American organist best known for his church music compositions.  He served as an editor, composer, and arranger on the Lorenz Publishing editorial staff between 1967 and 1982.  During this time, he received composing and arranging credits for over 1000 works. Smith died on June 24, 2015.

Smith was such a prolific composer/arranger that he published under at least seven names: his own, plus the pseudonyms Tom Birchwood, Edward Broughton, Christopher Gale, David Paxton, Gerald Peterson, and Franklin Ritter.

References

External links
 Biography from Lorenz Publishing website

American classical organists
Composers of Christian music
1934 births
2015 deaths